The Cajati Environmental Protection Area is an environmental protection area in the state of São Paulo, Brazil.

Location

The Cajati Environmental Protection Area is in the municipality of Cajati, São Paulo.
It is in the Atlantic Forest biome,
Vegetation is dense rainforest.
Hunting, fishing and sale of land are prohibited.

History 

This law broke up the old Jacupiranga State Park and created the Jacupiranga Mosaic with 14 conservation units.

Notes

Sources

Environmental protection areas of Brazil
Protected areas established in 2008
Protected areas of São Paulo (state)
2008 establishments in Brazil